Fagopyrum tibeticum is a species of flowering plants in the family Polygonaceae endemic to Tibet. It was formerly placed in the monotypic genus Parapteropyrum.

References

tibeticum
Endemic flora of Tibet